Baiyun Mountain may refer to:

 Baiyun Mountain (Henan), Song County, Luoyang, Henan, China
 Baiyun Mountain (Guangdong), Guangzhou, Guangdong, China
 , Fu'an, Fujian, China